Silva is an unincorporated community in Wayne County, Missouri, United States. It is located on U.S. Route 67 just south of  Missouri Route 34, approximately thirteen miles east of Piedmont and three miles north of Greenville. The community is at the north end of Lake Wappapello and the St. Francis River flows past one mile to the west.

A post office called Silva has been in operation since 1902. An early postmaster gave the community the name of one of her acquaintances.

Silva is home to Camp Lewallen, a Boy Scout Camp serving the Scouts of the Greater Saint Louis Area Council.

References

Unincorporated communities in Wayne County, Missouri
Unincorporated communities in Missouri